The Yaroslavl Constituency (No.194) is a Russian legislative constituency in Yaroslavl Oblast. Until 2007 the constituency covered the entirety of Yaroslavl and its suburbs. Since 2016 the constituency was gerrymandered to include half of Yaroslavl and rural eastern Yaroslavl Oblast.

Members elected

Election results

1993

|-
! colspan=2 style="background-color:#E9E9E9;text-align:left;vertical-align:top;" |Candidate
! style="background-color:#E9E9E9;text-align:left;vertical-align:top;" |Party
! style="background-color:#E9E9E9;text-align:right;" |Votes
! style="background-color:#E9E9E9;text-align:right;" |%
|-
|style="background-color:"|
|align=left|Yevgenia Tishkovskaya
|align=left|Independent
|
|22.28%
|-
| colspan="5" style="background-color:#E9E9E9;"|
|- style="font-weight:bold"
| colspan="3" style="text-align:left;" | Total
| 
| 100%
|-
| colspan="5" style="background-color:#E9E9E9;"|
|- style="font-weight:bold"
| colspan="4" |Source:
|
|}

1995

|-
! colspan=2 style="background-color:#E9E9E9;text-align:left;vertical-align:top;" |Candidate
! style="background-color:#E9E9E9;text-align:left;vertical-align:top;" |Party
! style="background-color:#E9E9E9;text-align:right;" |Votes
! style="background-color:#E9E9E9;text-align:right;" |%
|-
|style="background-color:"|
|align=left|Yelena Mizulina
|align=left|Yabloko
|
|22.96%
|-
|style="background-color:"|
|align=left|Vladimir Varukhin
|align=left|Democratic Russia and Free Trade Unions
|
|10.84%
|-
|style="background-color:#1C1A0D"|
|align=left|Sergey Zamoraev
|align=left|Forward, Russia!
|
|8.90%
|-
|style="background-color:"|
|align=left|Vladimir Smirnov
|align=left|Communist Party
|
|7.28%
|-
|style="background-color:#DA2021"|
|align=left|Yevgenia Tishkovskaya (incumbent)
|align=left|Ivan Rybkin Bloc
|
|6.34%
|-
|style="background-color:"|
|align=left|Vasily Koposov
|align=left|Independent
|
|5.52%
|-
|style="background-color:"|
|align=left|Vera Shevchuk
|align=left|Independent
|
|4.65%
|-
|style="background-color:"|
|align=left|Gennady Fedorov
|align=left|Liberal Democratic Party
|
|4.55%
|-
|style="background-color:#A8A821"|
|align=left|Andrey Generalov
|align=left|Stable Russia
|
|4.43%
|-
|style="background-color:"|
|align=left|Yevgeny Tyurin
|align=left|Independent
|
|4.10%
|-
|style="background-color:"|
|align=left|Boris Fomin
|align=left|Independent
|
|2.89%
|-
|style="background-color:"|
|align=left|Arkady Danilevich
|align=left|Independent
|
|1.84%
|-
|style="background-color:#FF8201"|
|align=left|Nikolay Mitrofanov
|align=left|Christian-Democratic Union - Christians of Russia
|
|1.55%
|-
|style="background-color:"|
|align=left|Dmitry Dvoeglazov
|align=left|Independent
|
|0.88%
|-
|style="background-color:#000000"|
|colspan=2 |against all
|
|9.68%
|-
| colspan="5" style="background-color:#E9E9E9;"|
|- style="font-weight:bold"
| colspan="3" style="text-align:left;" | Total
| 
| 100%
|-
| colspan="5" style="background-color:#E9E9E9;"|
|- style="font-weight:bold"
| colspan="4" |Source:
|
|}

1999

|-
! colspan=2 style="background-color:#E9E9E9;text-align:left;vertical-align:top;" |Candidate
! style="background-color:#E9E9E9;text-align:left;vertical-align:top;" |Party
! style="background-color:#E9E9E9;text-align:right;" |Votes
! style="background-color:#E9E9E9;text-align:right;" |%
|-
|style="background-color:"|
|align=left|Sergey Zagidullin
|align=left|Independent
|
|23.56%
|-
|style="background-color:"|
|align=left|Aleksandr Tsvetkov
|align=left|Independent
|
|18.44%
|-
|style="background-color:"|
|align=left|Sergey Zamoraev
|align=left|Independent
|
|9.50%
|-
|style="background-color:"|
|align=left|Yelena Mizulina (incumbent)
|align=left|Yabloko
|
|8.99%
|-
|style="background-color:"|
|align=left|Vladimir Stepanov
|align=left|Independent
|
|8.10%
|-
|style="background-color:#1042A5"|
|align=left|Vadim Romanov
|align=left|Union of Right Forces
|
|6.80%
|-
|style="background-color:#23238E"|
|align=left|Yevgeny Goryunov
|align=left|Our Home – Russia
|
|6.34%
|-
|style="background-color:#3B9EDF"|
|align=left|Yevgenia Tishkovskaya
|align=left|Fatherland – All Russia
|
|2.56%
|-
|style="background-color:"|
|align=left|Aleksandr Simon
|align=left|Independent
|
|1.33%
|-
|style="background-color:"|
|align=left|Mikhail Kovalev
|align=left|Independent
|
|0.91%
|-
|style="background-color:#004BBC"|
|align=left|Mikhail Kuznetsov
|align=left|Russian Cause
|
|0.85%
|-
|style="background-color:#FCCA19"|
|align=left|Vyacheslav Blatov
|align=left|Congress of Russian Communities-Yury Boldyrev Movement
|
|0.72%
|-
|style="background-color:"|
|align=left|Aleksey Naumov
|align=left|Independent
|
|0.53%
|-
|style="background-color:#FF4400"|
|align=left|Fedor Karpov
|align=left|Andrey Nikolayev and Svyatoslav Fyodorov Bloc
|
|0.48%
|-
|style="background-color:"|
|align=left|Valery Teplov
|align=left|Independent
|
|0.45%
|-
|style="background-color:"|
|align=left|Yelena Maslina
|align=left|Independent
|
|0.32%
|-
|style="background-color:#084284"|
|align=left|Sergey Zheleznov
|align=left|Spiritual Heritage
|
|0.31%
|-
|style="background-color:#000000"|
|colspan=2 |against all
|
|7.72%
|-
| colspan="5" style="background-color:#E9E9E9;"|
|- style="font-weight:bold"
| colspan="3" style="text-align:left;" | Total
| 
| 100%
|-
| colspan="5" style="background-color:#E9E9E9;"|
|- style="font-weight:bold"
| colspan="4" |Source:
|
|}

2003

|-
! colspan=2 style="background-color:#E9E9E9;text-align:left;vertical-align:top;" |Candidate
! style="background-color:#E9E9E9;text-align:left;vertical-align:top;" |Party
! style="background-color:#E9E9E9;text-align:right;" |Votes
! style="background-color:#E9E9E9;text-align:right;" |%
|-
|style="background-color:"|
|align=left|Yevgeny Zayashnikov
|align=left|United Russia
|
|28.19%
|-
|style="background-color:"|
|align=left|Aleksandr Tsvetkov
|align=left|Independent
|
|26.47%
|-
|style="background-color:"|
|align=left|Sergey Zagidullin (incumbent)
|align=left|Rodina
|
|13.08%
|-
|style="background-color:#1042A5"|
|align=left|Maksim Geyko
|align=left|Union of Right Forces
|
|4.77%
|-
|style="background-color:"|
|align=left|Ivan Makushok
|align=left|Communist Party
|
|4.34%
|-
|style="background-color:"|
|align=left|Sergey Baburkin
|align=left|Independent
|
|2.59%
|-
|style="background-color:#00A1FF"|
|align=left|Yevgeny Goryunov
|align=left|Party of Russia's Rebirth-Russian Party of Life
|
|1.98%
|-
|style="background-color:"|
|align=left|Vladimir Durnev
|align=left|Liberal Democratic Party
|
|1.30%
|-
|style="background-color:#000000"|
|colspan=2 |against all
|
|14.86%
|-
| colspan="5" style="background-color:#E9E9E9;"|
|- style="font-weight:bold"
| colspan="3" style="text-align:left;" | Total
| 
| 100%
|-
| colspan="5" style="background-color:#E9E9E9;"|
|- style="font-weight:bold"
| colspan="4" |Source:
|
|}

2016

|-
! colspan=2 style="background-color:#E9E9E9;text-align:left;vertical-align:top;" |Candidate
! style="background-color:#E9E9E9;text-align:leftt;vertical-align:top;" |Party
! style="background-color:#E9E9E9;text-align:right;" |Votes
! style="background-color:#E9E9E9;text-align:right;" |%
|-
| style="background-color: " |
|align=left|Aleksandr Gribov
|align=left|United Russia
|
|38.53%
|-
|style="background-color:"|
|align=left|Aleksandr Vorobyov
|align=left|Communist Party
|
|17.71%
|-
|style="background:"| 
|align=left|Sergey Balabaev
|align=left|A Just Russia
|
|14.90%
|-
|style="background-color:"|
|align=left|Andrey Potapov
|align=left|Liberal Democratic Party
|
|9.70%
|-
|style="background-color:"|
|align=left|Andrey Vorobyev
|align=left|Rodina
|
|4.39%
|-
|style="background:"| 
|align=left|Vladimir Zubkov
|align=left|Yabloko
|
|3.27%
|-
|style="background:"| 
|align=left|Yaroslav Yudin
|align=left|People's Freedom Party
|
|1.86%
|-
|style="background:"| 
|align=left|Sergey Agafonov
|align=left|Communists of Russia
|
|1.80%
|-
|style="background-color:"|
|align=left|Roman Fomichev
|align=left|The Greens
|
|1.70%
|-
|style="background-color:"|
|align=left|Anton Artemyev
|align=left|Party of Growth
|
|1.48%
|-
|style="background-color:"|
|align=left|Ivan Sinitsyn
|align=left|Patriots of Russia
|
|1.34%
|-
| colspan="5" style="background-color:#E9E9E9;"|
|- style="font-weight:bold"
| colspan="3" style="text-align:left;" | Total
| 
| 100%
|-
| colspan="5" style="background-color:#E9E9E9;"|
|- style="font-weight:bold"
| colspan="4" |Source:
|
|}

2020

|-
! colspan=2 style="background-color:#E9E9E9;text-align:left;vertical-align:top;" |Candidate
! style="background-color:#E9E9E9;text-align:left;vertical-align:top;" |Party
! style="background-color:#E9E9E9;text-align:right;" |Votes
! style="background-color:#E9E9E9;text-align:right;" |%
|-
|style="background-color: " |
|align=left|Andrey Kovalenko
|align=left|United Russia
|47,562
|40.27%
|-
|style="background-color: " |
|align=left|Anatoly Lisitsyn
|align=left|A Just Russia
|40,407
|34.21%
|-
|style="background-color: " |
|align=left|Yelena Kuznetsova
|align=left|Communist Party
|13,817
|11.70%
|-
|style="background-color: " |
|align=left|Oleg Vinogradov
|align=left|Yabloko
|4,578
|3.88%
|-
|style="background-color: " |
|align=left|Irina Lobanova
|align=left|Liberal Democratic Party
|4,049
|3.43%
|-
|style="background-color:" |
|align=left|Vladimir Vorozhtsov
|align=left|Party of Pensioners
|2,188
|1.85%
|-
|style="background-color: #ff2e2e" |
|align=left|Oleg Bulayev
|align=left|Communist Party of Social Justice
|1,380
|1.17%
|-
|style="background-color: " |
|align=left|Oksana Romashkova
|align=left|Communists of Russia
|1,356
|1.15%
|-
| colspan="5" style="background-color:#E9E9E9;"|
|- style="font-weight:bold"
| colspan="3" style="text-align:left;" | Total
| 118,108
| 100%
|-
| colspan="5" style="background-color:#E9E9E9;"|
|- style="font-weight:bold"
| colspan="4" |Source:
|
|}

2021

|-
! colspan=2 style="background-color:#E9E9E9;text-align:left;vertical-align:top;" |Candidate
! style="background-color:#E9E9E9;text-align:left;vertical-align:top;" |Party
! style="background-color:#E9E9E9;text-align:right;" |Votes
! style="background-color:#E9E9E9;text-align:right;" |%
|-
|style="background-color: " |
|align=left|Anatoly Lisitsyn
|align=left|A Just Russia — For Truth
|
|36.47%
|-
|style="background-color: " |
|align=left|Andrey Kovalenko (incumbent)
|align=left|United Russia
|
|27.27%
|-
|style="background-color:"|
|align=left|Yelena Kuznetsova
|align=left|Communist Party
|
|15.05%
|-
|style="background-color: "|
|align=left|Vladislav Miroshnichenko
|align=left|New People
|
|4.93%
|-
|style="background-color:"|
|align=left|Irina Lobanova
|align=left|Liberal Democratic Party
|
|3.90%
|-
|style="background-color: "|
|align=left|Yulia Ovchinnikova
|align=left|Party of Pensioners
|
|3.03%
|-
|style="background-color: " |
|align=left|Dmitry Petrovsky
|align=left|Communists of Russia
|
|2.83%
|-
|style="background-color: " |
|align=left|Sergey Balabaev
|align=left|Yabloko
|
|2.60%
|-
|style="background-color:"|
|align=left|Dmitry Trusov
|align=left|The Greens
|
|1.69%
|-
| colspan="5" style="background-color:#E9E9E9;"|
|- style="font-weight:bold"
| colspan="3" style="text-align:left;" | Total
| 
| 100%
|-
| colspan="5" style="background-color:#E9E9E9;"|
|- style="font-weight:bold"
| colspan="4" |Source:
|
|}

See also 
 Rostov constituency

Notes

References

Russian legislative constituencies
Politics of Yaroslavl Oblast